Mount Trebeshinë is a mountain in southern Albania in the geographical region of Southern Mountain Range. It is part of the mountain chain Trebeshinë-Dhembel-Nemërçkë which goes parallel to the Shëndelli-Lunxhëri-Bureto chain.

Trebeshinë has been identified with the ancient Mount Meropus.

References

Bibliography

Trebeshine
Illyrian Albania